In enzymology, a 4-phosphoerythronate dehydogenase is an enzyme that catalyzes the chemical reaction

4-phospho-D-erythronate + NAD+  (3R)-3-hydroxy-2-oxo-4-phosphonooxybutanoate + NADH + H+

Thus, the two substrates of this enzyme are 4-phospho-D-erythronate and NAD+, whereas its 3 products are (3R)-3-hydroxy-2-oxo-4-phosphonooxybutanoate, NADH, and H+.

This enzyme belongs to the family of oxidoreductases, specifically those acting on the CH-OH group of donor with NAD+ or NADP+ as acceptor. The systematic name of this enzyme class is 4-phospho-D-erythronate:NAD+ 2-oxidoreductase. Other names in common use include PdxB, PdxB 4PE dehydrogenase, and 4-O-phosphoerythronate dehydrogenase. This enzyme participates in vitamin B6 metabolism.

Structural studies

As of late 2007, only one structure has been solved for this class of enzymes, with the PDB accession code .

References

 
 
 
 
 

EC 1.1.1
NADH-dependent enzymes
Enzymes of known structure